The Stone House Site is a historic house site in James City County, Virginia, near Toano. It is the location of house ruins of uncertain age. The ruins are of a stone house, built in a location where materials transport is not easy. The house was known to be of great antiquity in the 19th century.

The site was listed on the National Register of Historic Places in 1973.

See also
National Register of Historic Places listings in James City County, Virginia

References

Archaeological sites on the National Register of Historic Places in Virginia
James City County, Virginia
Ruins in the United States
National Register of Historic Places in James City County, Virginia